Bolten is a surname. Notable people with the surname include:

Alida Bolten (1903–1984), Dutch freestyle swimmer
 (1718- 1796), German physician and conchologist
Joshua Bolten (born 1954), American governmental official
Virginia Bolten (1870–1960), Argentinian anarchist

See also
Bolten Peak, a summit in Antarctica
Bolton (disambiguation)
Peter Friedrich Röding, German malacologist whose work was misattributed to Joachim Friedrich Bolten